Robert Lindsay Cromar (8 October 1931 – 4 June 2007) was a Scottish amateur footballer who made over 360 appearances as a right half and right back in the Scottish League for Queen's Park. He captained the club and later served as president. Cromar represented Scotland at amateur level and captained the team on occasion.

Personal life 
Cromar was married with three children. He rose to the position of joint-general manager of Bank of Scotland.

Honours 
Scotland Amateurs
 FA Centenary Amateur International Tournament

References 

Scottish footballers
Scottish Football League players
Association football wing halves
Queen's Park F.C. players
1931 births
Footballers from Glasgow
2007 deaths
Association football fullbacks
Association football forwards
Scotland amateur international footballers
Bank of Scotland people
Queen's Park F.C. non-playing staff